Mah Sharaf Khanom Mastoureh Ardalan or Mastura Ardalan (1805, Sanandaj − 1848, Sulaymaniyah) was a Kurdish poet, historian, and writer.

Biography
Ardalan was born in Sanandaj eastern Kurdistan/Iranian Kurdistan and died in Sulaymaniyah southern Kurdistan/Iraqi Kurdistan. She was a member of the feudal aristocracy in the court of the Ardalan principality centered in Senna. She studied Kurdish, Arabic and Persian under the supervision of her father, Abolhasan Beig Qadiri. Her husband, Khasraw Khani Ardalan was the ruler of the principality. Her husband's death left the principality vulnerable to outside interference. When the Qajar state conquered the Ardalan territory in the 19th century, she and her family left for the Baban principality centered in Sulaymaniyah. Her son, Reza Qulikhan, the successor to Khasraw Khan, was imprisoned by the Qajars.

Works
She wrote several books of poetry, history and literature. She mainly wrote in the Hawrami or Gorani dialect of Kurdish and in Persian, but she has a few poems in Central Kurdish as well. Most her Kurdish poetry was forgotten during the 20th century and was rediscovered and published by the end of 20th  and the beginning of 21st century. She was a poet and said to be the only woman historiographer of the Middle East until the end of the nineteenth century. She wrote a book about the history of the Kurdish Ardalan dynasty. She also wrote a collection of poems, which has been republished in recent years.

Legacy
Her 200th birthday was celebrated recently in a festival in Hewler (Erbil), in the Iraqi Kurdistan region, where her statue was unveiled in a ceremony. A conference was held on the works of Mastoureh in Erbil from 11 to 15 December 2005. Over one hundred scientific and cultural figures from across the world attended the congress in Iraqi Kurdistan, in which thirty articles in Kurdish, Persian, English, and Arabic were presented about the life and works of Mastoureh Ardalan. In addition, several of her works were published by the organizers in Persian and Kurdish during the congress.

A statue of Ardalan by Iranian sculptor Hadi Zia-dini now stands in Sanandaj, Iran.

Books
 Khronika Doma Ardalan: Ta'rikh-I Ardalan by Mah Sharaf Khanum Kurdistani and E. I. Vasileva,  / 502016559X 
 Divan-i Masturah Kurdistani, Collection of poems, 238 pp., 1998, .

References

Sources
Some of the Kurdish Poems of Mastura Ardalan
Mastura Mâh-Sharaf Khâtun in Kurdish Literature
Mastura Kurdistani, by Shahla Dabbaghi, in Kurdish
About the Mastura Commemoration Congress in Irbil
Woman poet statue set up in Irbil, Hewler Globe

1805 births
1848 deaths
Kurdish poets
Kurdish writers
Iranian Kurdish women
People from Sanandaj
Kurdish women poets
Kurdish women writers
Iranian women writers
Kurdish scholars
19th-century poets
Kurdish philosophers
19th-century women writers
19th-century Persian-language writers
19th-century Kurdish people